AD 64 (LXIV) was a leap year starting on Sunday (link will display the full calendar) of the Julian calendar, the 64th Year of the Anno Domini designation, the 64th year of the 1st millennium, the 64th year of the 1st century, and the 4th year of the 7th decade. At the time, it was known as the Year of the Consulship of Bassus and Crassus (or, less frequently, year 817 Ab urbe condita). The denomination AD 64 for this year has been used since the early medieval period, when the Anno Domini calendar era became the prevalent method in Europe for naming years.

Events

By place

Roman Empire 
 July 19 – Great Fire of Rome: A fire begins in the merchant area of Rome and soon burns completely out of control, while Emperor Nero allegedly plays his lyre and sings, as he watches the blaze from a safe distance. There is no hard evidence to support this claim: fires were very common in Rome at the time. The fire destroys close to one-half of the city and is officially blamed on the Christians, a small but growing religious movement; Nero is accused of being the arsonist by popular rumour.
 Persecution of Christians in Rome begins under Nero. Peter the Apostle is possibly among those crucified.
 Nero proposes a new urban planning program based on the creation of buildings decorated with ornate porticos, the widening of the streets and the use of open spaces. This plan will not be applied until after his death in AD 68.
 Lyon sends a large sum of money to Rome to aid in the reconstruction. However, during the winter of AD 64–65, Lyon suffers a catastrophic fire itself, and Nero reciprocates by sending money to Lyon.

Asia 
 The Kushan sack the ancient town of Taxila (in modern-day Pakistan).

By topic

Religion 
 First Epistle of Peter written from Babylon according to traditional Christian belief.
 Paul leaves Titus in Crete as bishop (approximate date) Then goes to Asia Minor

Arts and sciences 
 Seneca proclaims the equality of all men, including slaves.

Births 
 September 13 – Julia Flavia, daughter of Titus and lover of his brother Domitian (d. AD 96)
 Julia Agricola, daughter of Gnaeus Julius Agricola
 Philo of Byblos, Phoenician historian and writer (d. 141)

Deaths 
 October 13 — Peter the Apostle (Margherita Guarducci, who led the research leading to the rediscovery of Peter's reputed tomb in 1963, concluded that Peter died on that date, shortly after the Great Fire of Rome and during the festivities to mark "dies imperii" of Emperor Nero, and that Peter and other Christians were crucified in honor of the decennial of Nero's October 13, AD 54 ascension to the imperial throne.)  (b. 1 BC)
 Decimus Junius Silanus Torquatus, Roman consul (b. AD 16)
 Paul the Apostle (earliest date) (b. AD 5)
 Yin Lihua, Chinese empress (b. AD 5)

See also 

 First Martyrs of the Church of Ancient Rome

References 

0064

als:60er#64